The École nationale des sciences appliquées d'Al Hoceima (National School of Applied Sciences of Al Hoceima) is a Moroccan public engineering school located in Al Hoceima, Al Hoceïma Province. It is a part of Morocco's national network of schools of applied sciences. It was established in 2008.

Curriculum
Six programmes are offered at the institution:
Computer engineering
Civil engineering
Environmental engineering
energies and renewable energies engineering
Data engineering
Mechanical engineering

See also

 Education in Morocco
 List of engineering schools
 List of universities in Morocco

External links
  (in French language), the school's official website

Educational institutions established in 2008
Al Hoceïma Province
Buildings and structures in Tanger-Tetouan-Al Hoceima
Engineering universities and colleges
Public universities and colleges
Universities and colleges in Morocco
2008 establishments in Morocco
21st-century architecture in Morocco